Sphaerobambos is a genus of Southeast Asian bamboo, in the grass family.

Species
 Sphaerobambos hirsuta S.Dransf. - Sabah
 Sphaerobambos philippinensis  (Gamble) S.Dransf. - Mindanao
 Sphaerobambos subtilis S.Dransf. - Sulawesi

References

Bambusoideae
Bambusoideae genera